The Mombasa–Nairobi  Expressway or Nairobi–Mombasa Expressway, also known as the Nairobi–Mombasa Highway, is a proposed four-lane toll highway in Kenya. The highway will link Nairobi, the capital and largest city of Kenya to Mombasa, the largest seaport of the country. The new highway is expected to cut travel times between the two cities from the current 6 to 10 hours to approximately four hours.

Location
It continues in a general southeasterly direction, through Ngong, Ongata Rongai, Kisaju and Isinya to rejoin the existing Nairobi–Mombasa Road, just north of Konza. The coordinates of this road at Kibwezi are: 02°25'04.0"S, 37°57'39.0"E (Latitude:-2.417778; Longitude:37.960833).

Overview
The planned expressway is a dual-carriage motorway with initially four lanes, expandable to six lanes in the future.

The expressway is intended to serve as "a central part of the national and regional transport system, helping promote trade and development in Kenya" and the regional neighbors of Uganda, Rwanda and the Democratic Republic of the Congo, Burundi and South Sudan.

The expressway is expected to improve roadway safety between the two cities. It is also expected to reduce logistics costs along the Mombasa-Nairobi transportation corridor. The construction phase is expected to create an estimated 500 construction jobs.

History
In February 2015, the Kenyan government hired PriceWaterhouseCoopers (PwC) to conduct a feasibility study on the commercial and technical viability of the Nairobi–Mombasa Expressway. The PwC report indicated the highway was viable if the highway operator collected a toll that would be used to retire the private capital used to develop the expressway. Starting about that time as well, the government of Kenya, through the Kenya National Highways Authority (KeNHA), began detailed talks with Bechtel International on a public-private partnership (PPP) to design, fund, construct and operate the highway.

Construction costs
The cost of constructing this expressway is budgeted at US$2.1 billion. Part of the funding is expected from the Export–Import Bank of the United States and the US-based Overseas Private Investment Corporation.

Timetable
In August 2017, KeNHA signed a binding agreement with Betchel International, an American civil engineering and construction company to design, construct, and operate the proposed expressway. The expressway will be developed in 10 sections and is designed to have 19 interchanges. Construction is expected to start in July 2018. Completion of the first section is expected in October 2019, with the entire expressway expected to open in 2024.

In April 2019, the Business Daily newspaper reported that construction is expected to start in the second half of calendar year 2019.

See also
 List of roads in Kenya
 Transport in Kenya

References

Further reading

External links
Website of Kenya National Highways Authority

Roads in Kenya
Transport in Nairobi
Machakos County
Kajiado County
Makueni County
Taita-Taveta County
Kwale County
Mombasa County
Buildings and structures in Kenya